In mathematics, the Lindelöf hypothesis is a conjecture by Finnish mathematician Ernst Leonard Lindelöf (see ) about the rate of growth of the Riemann zeta function on the critical line. This hypothesis is implied by the Riemann hypothesis.  It says that for any ε > 0,

as t tends to infinity (see big O notation). Since ε can be replaced by a smaller value, the conjecture can be restated as follows: for any positive ε,

The μ function
If σ is real, then μ(σ) is defined to be the infimum of all real numbers a such that ζ(σ + iT ) = O(T a). It is trivial to check that μ(σ) = 0 for σ > 1, and the functional equation of the zeta function implies that μ(σ) = μ(1 − σ) − σ + 1/2. The Phragmén–Lindelöf theorem implies that μ is a convex function. The Lindelöf hypothesis states μ(1/2) = 0, which together with the above properties of μ implies that μ(σ) is 0 for σ ≥ 1/2 and 1/2 − σ for σ ≤ 1/2.

Lindelöf's convexity result together with μ(1) = 0 and μ(0) = 1/2 implies that 0 ≤ μ(1/2) ≤ 1/4.  The upper bound of 1/4 was lowered by Hardy and Littlewood to 1/6 by applying Weyl's method of estimating exponential sums to the approximate functional equation. It has since been lowered to slightly less than 1/6 by several authors using long and technical proofs, as in the following table:

Relation to the Riemann hypothesis
 (1918–1919) showed that the Lindelöf hypothesis is equivalent to the following statement about the zeros of the zeta function: for every ε > 0, the number of zeros with real part at least 1/2 + ε and imaginary part between T and T + 1 is o(log(T)) as T tends to infinity. The Riemann hypothesis implies that there are no zeros at all in this region and so implies the Lindelöf hypothesis. The number of zeros with imaginary part between T and T + 1 is known to be O(log(T)), so the Lindelöf hypothesis seems only slightly stronger than what has already been proved, but in spite of this it has resisted all attempts to prove it.

Means of powers (or moments) of the zeta function
The Lindelöf hypothesis is equivalent to the statement that

for all positive integers k and all positive real numbers ε. This has been proved for k = 1 or 2, but the case k = 3 seems much harder and is still an open problem.

There is a much more precise conjecture about the asymptotic behavior of the integral: it is believed that

for some constants ck,j&hairsp;.
(extending a  result of  who found the leading term).

 suggested the value 
 
for the leading coefficient when k is 6, and  used random matrix theory to suggest some conjectures for the values of the coefficients for higher k. The leading coefficients are conjectured to be the product of an elementary factor, a certain product over primes, and the number of n × n Young tableaux given by the sequence
1, 1, 2, 42, 24024, 701149020, ... .

Other consequences
Denoting by pn the n-th prime number, a result by Albert Ingham shows that the Lindelöf hypothesis implies that, for any ε > 0,

if n is sufficiently large. However, this result is much worse than that of the large prime gap conjecture.

L-functions 
The Riemann zeta function belongs to a more general family of functions called L-functions.
In 2010, new methods to obtain sub-convexity estimates for L-functions in the PGL(2) case were given by Joseph Bernstein and Andre Reznikov and in the GL(1) and GL(2) case by Akshay Venkatesh and Philippe Michel and in 2021 for the GL(n) case by Paul Nelson.

Notes and references

 

 2001 pbk reprint

 

Conjectures
Zeta and L-functions
Unsolved problems in number theory
Analytic number theory